Diamitosa moseri is a species of beetle in the family Cerambycidae, and the only species in the genus Diamitosa. It was described by Kriesche in 1927.

References

Parmenini
Beetles described in 1927